The Men's team pursuit event of the 2015 UCI Track Cycling World Championships was held on 18–19 February 2015.

Results

Qualifying
The qualifying was held at 16:25.

First round
The first round was started at 16:45.

Finals
The finals were started at 21:45.

References

Men's team pursuit
UCI Track Cycling World Championships – Men's team pursuit